Boy Meets Girl: Tholiprema Katha is a 2014 Indian Telugu-language romantic comedy film directed by  Vasanth Dayakar and starring Siddharth Jonnalagadda, Nikhita Anil (in her Telugu debut) and Kanika Tiwari.

The film was released on 28 March 2014 around the time of Ugadi and was a box office failure.

Cast 
Source
Siddhu Jonnalagadda as Siddhu 
Nikhita Anil as Maha Lakshmi
Kanika Tiwari as Mahalakshmi
Vennela Kishore
Praveen
 Chanti
Surya
Madhumani
Harish
Shankar as Rambabu

Production 
Vasanth Dayakar, who previously worked for Bommarillu Bhaskar and Srikanth Addala, made his directorial debut with this film. Malayali actress Nikhita Anil made her Telugu debut with this film.

Reception 
A critic from The Times of India wrote that "Director Vasanth Dayakar handles the subject well though the comedy sometimes goes haywire. The artistes live their roles, thanks also to the cinematography". A critic from 123Telugu said that "On the whole, Tholi Prema Katha (Boy Meets Girl) is just another ordinary love story. Few comedy scenes will surely go well with the youngsters". A critic from Indiaglitz said that "A second-rate rom-com with nothing exciting".

References

External links 

Ragalahari news